Nataša Tapušković (née Šolak; ; born 27 August 1975) is a Serbian actress. She is famous for her role as Danica Janković in Barking at the Stars (1998) and for her role as Bosnian hostage Sabaha in Emir Kusturica's Life Is a Miracle (2004).

Filmography

References

External links

1975 births
Living people
Actors from Kruševac
20th-century Serbian actresses
21st-century Serbian actresses
Serbian film actresses
Serbian television actresses
Dr. Branivoj Đorđević Award winners